Grand Slam is a fictional character from the G.I. Joe: A Real American Hero toyline and comic book series. He is the G.I. Joe Team's original laser artillery soldier and debuted in 1982.

Profile
His real name is James J. Barney, and his rank is that of sergeant E-5. Grand Slam was born in Chippewa Falls, Wisconsin.

His primary military specialty is artillery and his secondary military specialty is an electronics engineer. He received initial training in conventional artillery and served with a 155mm battery. He graduated at the top of his class from Special Weapons School. Grand Slam also graduated from Artillery School & Advanced Tech School as well as being a qualified expert with the M-16, M-1911A1, the H.A.L. (Heavy Artillery Laser) and JUMP (Jet Mobile Propulsion Unit). He has an uncanny ability to estimate distances and plot trajectories with amazing accuracy. He is also noted for being an introvert, losing himself in escapist fantasy such as science fiction novels and comic books.

Toys
Grand Slam appeared first as part of the original 1982 toy line, and was packaged with the "H.A.L." (Heavy Artillery Laser). All of the original sixteen figures from 1982 were released with "straight arms." The same figure was re-released in 1983 with "swivel-arm battle grip", which made it easier for figures to hold their rifles and accessories. In 1983, the Grand Slam figure was also recolored with silver pads on his arms, legs and chest, and recast as a laser jet pack soldier, packaged with the J.U.M.P.

In 2007, a brand new incarnation of Grand Slam was released in the 8" Sigma 6 line. This was the only Grand Slam toy to ever feature a unique head sculpt. Every other version of him used a repainted head from a different character. A 25th Anniversary/Modern Era figure was released with a recolored SHARC in 2008. A Rise of Cobra figure was released as a Target exclusive with a different color scheme and lower legs. Another movie figure using the original 25th Anniversary mold was packaged with Hawk and Laser Artillery Weapon as a Wal-Mart exclusive.

Grand Slam appeared once again in 2014 as a part of the G.I. Joe Collector Club's Figure Subscription Service, sporting the original 1982 color scheme, with the same portable missile launcher included with most versions of the Cobra weapons specialist Scrap-Iron figure.

Comics
Grand Slam has been a fixture in G.I. Joe comics ever since his debut in 1982. He appeared often in both the Marvel Comics series and the Devil's Due Publishing series. He also appeared in the new IDW Publishing series and in several alternate continuities.

Marvel Comics
In the Marvel Comics G.I. Joe series, he first appeared in G.I. Joe: A Real American Hero #1 (June 1982), along with the rest of the original team. The entire team attacks a Cobra stronghold to retrieve Dr. Adele Burkhart, a famous pacifist and scientist with national secrets. The mission is successful, though Cobra Commander escapes.

Several months later, after a battle at the United States Treasury building, Grand Slam and Stalker spot Major Bludd trying to escape Washington, D.C. aboard a hijacked bus. The two Joes pursue Bludd on a RAM motorcycle. Grand Slam climbs on top of the moving bus and kicks through the glass front window. He subdues Major Bludd with several punches. These wounds are then exaggerated by Bludd and a Cobra agent doctor. The two accuse Grand Slam of excessive force as part of an escape plot that ultimately fails.

Grand Slam is also featured in G.I. Joe: A Real American Hero #59 (May 1987). He and other Joe soldiers are attacked by Cobra forces while returning from weapon testing. He appears in issue 82, supervising the new Joes Repeater, Budo and Lightfoot. They are backup to stop a Cobra-backed theft of valuable weapons. The four succeed, but Grand Slam is severely wounded in the fighting. He survives.

Devil's Due
He has appeared in many of the Joe comics produced by Devil's Due. Grand Slam is one of the many Joes called back into action to fight against Serpentor in the second Cobra civil war. Like the first one, this takes place on Cobra Island. Later, he is one of the guards for Scrap-Iron and Major Bludd at Blackwater Prison.

IDW
Grand Slam had very little exposure in the IDW reboot of the comic. He first appeared in G.I. Joe Origins #7, but he was unceremoniously killed by a sniper on the same page in which he was introduced. However, in 2017 series he was revealed to be alive.

In the alternate universe continuity of G.I.Joe: Revolutions Grand Slam was severely wounded in a friendly fire incident when he was mistakenly believed to be one of the shape-shifting Dire Wraiths. Later he is seen paralyzed from the waist down. Grand Slam still contributes with his technical knowledge, however he remains bitter due to his injuries.

Animated series
Grand Slam is unique in that he is the only member of the original thirteen first-year characters from the G.I. Joe toyline to not appear in the Real American Hero animated series.

References

External links
 Grand Slam at JMM's G.I. Joe Comics Home Page

Comics characters introduced in 1982
Fictional characters from Wisconsin
Fictional military sergeants
Fictional United States Army personnel
G.I. Joe soldiers
Male characters in comics